Le Bourg-Dun is a commune in the Seine-Maritime department in the Normandy region in northern France.

Geography

Population

Places of interest
 A sixteenth century manorhouse at the hamlet of Flainville.
 St.Julien's chapel, dating from the fourteenth century.
 The church of Notre-Dame, dating from the thirteenth century.

See also
Communes of the Seine-Maritime department

References

External links

 Official website of Bourg-Dun 

Communes of Seine-Maritime